Leslie railway station served the village of Leslie, Fife, Scotland, from 1861 to 1932 on the Leslie Railway.

History 
The station was opened on 1 February 1861 by the Leslie Railway. To the south was the goods shed, the goods yard being further to the south. It also has an exchange yard near the junction. On the south side of the line was the signal box, which opened in 1891. It closed in 1926. The station closed on 4 January 1932.

References 

Disused railway stations in Fife
Railway stations in Great Britain opened in 1861
Railway stations in Great Britain closed in 1932
1861 establishments in Scotland
1932 disestablishments in Scotland